Quebecol is a polyphenolic chemical compound that has been isolated from maple syrup. It has the chemical formula C24H26O7 and the systematic name 2,3,3-tri-(3-methoxy-4-hydroxyphenyl)-1-propanol. Analysis of maple sap before it is converted into syrup suggests that this compound is not naturally present in the sap but, instead, is formed during extraction or processing.
A total synthesis of the compound was reported in 2013.

The chemical compound is named after the Canadian province of Quebec which is the world’s largest producer of maple syrup.

References 

Polyphenols